Wrede is a surname that includes two different noble families, the German princely one and Finnish-Swede noble family "von Wrede" that originated from Westphalia. It may refer to:

People
Carolus Wrede (1860–1927), Finnish industrialist
Caspar Wrede (1929–1998), Finnish film director
Fabian Wrede, Count of Östanå (1641–1712), Swedish baron and advisor to King Charles XI of Sweden
Fritz Wrede (1868−1945), German fairground barrel and organ builder, inventor
Gustaf Wrede (1889–1958), Finnish engineer and businessman
Karl Philipp von Wrede (1767–1838), Bavarian field-marshal
Klaus-Jürgen Wrede (born 1963), German game designer, creator of the board game Carcassonne
Mathilda Wrede (1864–1928), Finnish baroness and philanthropist
Patricia Wrede (born 1953), American fantasy writer
Theodor Freiherr von Wrede (1888–1973), German general in the Wehrmacht 
William Wrede (1859–1906), German theologian

Places
Wrede Range, a mountain range in Canada
Wrede School, Gillespie County, Texas

German-language surnames